Suryakantham  (28 October 1924 – 18 December 1994) was an Indian actress in Tollywood. She was popular for playing the role of a cruel mother-in-law in most of her movies.

Early life
Suryakantham was born and brought up in a Telugu Brahmin family residing at Venkata Krishnaraya Puram near Kakinada of East Godavari district in Andhra Pradesh. She was the 14th child to her parents, ten of whose children had died. She learnt dance and singing at the age of six.

She married Peddibhotla Chalapati Rao, a High Court Judge, in 1950.

Career
Suryakantham started as a dancer in Chandralekha, produced by the Gemini Studios, for which she had been paid Rs 75 in remuneration. She got her first role as character artiste in Narada Naradi, but eventually quit her job at Gemini Studios.

Later, she got a character artist role in the movie Gruhapravesam. She was offered the heroine's role in Soudamini, but did not accept it. She later was in a car accident, in which she received injuries to her face. She later played the role of a cruel mother-in-law in Samsaram.

Another "heroine" role was offered to her from a Bollywood film producer. Knowing that the producer had dropped a heroine from his movie on personal grounds, and that the same was given to her, Suryakantham rejected the offer, saying "I can't live on the unhappiness of other artists."  She subsequently appeared in the Telugu film Kodarikam, which brought her a new level of success. The directors B. Nagi Reddy and Chakrapani would not do a movie without Suryakantham. They produced the movie Gundamma Katha, starring N. T. Rama Rao, Akkineni Nageswara Rao and S.V. Ranga Rao, with Suryakantham playing the lead role of Gundamma. The film was commercially successful.

Awards and titles

Awards
 Mahanati Savitri Memorial Award
 Honorary Doctorate Padmavati Mahila University

Titles
 Gayyali atta
 Sahaja Nata Kala Siromani
 Haasya Nata Siromani
 Bahumukha Natanaa Praveena
 Rangasthala Siromani
 Arungalai Maamani (Tamil)

Filmography

References

External links
 

1924 births
1994 deaths
Actresses in Telugu cinema
20th-century Indian actresses
Telugu actresses
People from Kakinada
Actresses from Andhra Pradesh
Indian film actresses
Telugu comedians
Indian women comedians
Actresses in Tamil cinema
20th-century comedians